Aphonopelma joshua is a species of spider in the family Theraphosidae, found in United States (California).

References

joshua
Spiders of the United States
Spiders described in 1997